Joffa: The Movie is a 2010 independent Australian buddy movie starring Australian sports fan Joffa Corfe. The film was financed by director and producer Chris Liontos; additional acting roles include performances by actor Shane McRae ( who stars as Joffa's friend in the movie) and cameos by Father Bob McGuire and Australian Football Hall of Fame legend Kevin Bartlett.

Plot 
Joffa Corfe and Shane McRae star as a couple of knockabout handymen with a passion for the Collingwood Football Club. The pair was described to have a knack for attracting trouble, which drives the local priest Father Bob McGuire to the point of despair. The film portrays Joffa as an ordinary man. The fact he attracts the affection of thousands and the hatred of tens of thousands is just how it is for the man who guides the Collingwood Cheer Squad.

Corfe said that the ordinary people who inhabit his real world "give the movie its heart." People such as Fr. Bob McGuire, Kevin Bartlett, and 93-year-old Mavis, used to attend dances with Ron Barassi's father.

One of the highlights for Australian audiences is hearing Good Old Collingwood Forever sung in Mandarin. Another is hearing a classic Australian food, the Chiko Roll, being explained to a Londoner.

The Australian Council on Children and the Media said that the main messages from this movie are: "Working together as a team is what wins the game." And "Mateship is one of the most important and meaningful things in life."

Cast 
The main cast includes:

 Joffa Corfe as Joffa
 Shane McRae as Shane
 Fr. Bob McGuire as Himself
 Kevin Bartlett as Himself

Rating
The Australian Government Classification Board rated Joffa: The Movie as PG -- Parental Guidance Recommended—for its mild coarse language.

Production

Script
Producer-director Chris Liontos started out by wondering why nobody was making films about Aussie Rules football. His inspiration was The Club (1980), a classic Australian movie. He decided to explore the world of Aussie Rules "through the eyes of the most passionate supporter in the country."

Filming
The overseas segments were filmed on the cheap, with the crew living in backpacker bunkrooms, eating baked beans and dodging crack addicts.

Budget
The budget was less than A$200,000. "I took a risk on fully self-funding this, no grants at all", said Liontos. "A lot of films these days do get a lot of (government) funding. Nobody goes and sees them."

The risk appeared to pay off. The film was released nationally on 2 September 2010. For such "an ultra-low budget movie to get a national cinema release – this has never happened (before)," Liontos said.

Locations
The film is set partly in Australia (Melbourne and Drouin, Victoria) and partly in the UK (London and Glasgow).

Celtic F.C.
Although best known as an active supporter of Australian Rules football, Corfe takes a passionate interest in the Scottish Premier League soccer club Celtic F.C. So much so, that he included a pilgrimage to Celtic Park, Glasgow, in the movie.

Critical reception 
The film has received a mixed reception to date. While Collingwood supporters provide uniformly positive reviews, non-Collingwood fans have been less than thrilled. Greg King of FilmReviews.net.au said that "the only thing more excruciating than sitting through this film would be to endure watching Collingwood win another premiership."

Professional reviewer Leigh Paatsch said that "With his tatty jacket of gold, albino mullet hairdo and a face made for keeping birds off crops, the infamous general of the Collingwood cheer squad was never going to be your typical movie star." He added that "Joffa is definitely a natural in front of the cameras. Just a shame that those behind the cameras of Joffa: The Movie are not."

The Australian Council on Children and the Media said that Joffa: The Movie is a "light-hearted mockumentary targeting an adult audience, but which may appeal to those adolescents with an interest in football. The film has some funny moments, particularly those involving Father Bob."

Donna Demaio, reporter for The Age, likened the movie to Kenny, another famous Australian mockumentary.

DVD release
Joffa: The Movie was released nationally in Australia on 2 December 2010 by Madman Entertainment.

See also
 Cinema of Australia
 List of Australian films
 Australian films of 2010
 List of films set in Australia
 List of films shot in Melbourne

References

External links 
 
 
 3AW interview Joffa gets his own full-length movie
 Joffa's Front Page
 Australian Council on Children & the Media Joffa the Movie
 Joffa: You bloody idiot The Age reporter Donna Demaio speaks to Joffa about his movie and tries on the gold jacket for size

2010 films
2010 independent films
Australian sports comedy films
Australian rules football films
Films set in Melbourne
Films shot in Melbourne
Australian independent films
2010s mockumentary films
Association football films
2010 directorial debut films
2010s English-language films